This is a round-up of the 1975 Sligo Senior Football Championship. Eastern Harps claimed their first title in only their third year in existence, after defeating Craobh Rua in the final. This was the last hurrah for Craobh Rua - they would later join forces with Muire Naofa to form the St. Mary's club for the following year.

Group stages

The Championship was contested by 15 teams, divided into four groups. The top side in each group advanced to the semi-finals.

Group A

Group B

Group C

Group D

Semi-finals

Sligo Senior Football Championship Final

References 

 Sligo Champion (Autumn 1975)

Sligo Senior Football Championship
Sligo